Metisse is a 2.5D X window manager with many features that set it apart from the traditional 3D "cube" workspace. Windows can be turned three-dimensionally in any direction, enabling the user to fit more windows onto a screen, and they can be scaled, all while remaining fully operational. The development team has avoided such effects as wobbly windows, giving functionality and productivity higher priority than eye candy.

Metisse was available for Mandriva One 2007, PCLinuxOS 2007, Sabayon Linux, Arch Linux, other Linux distrobutions, FreeBSD (with active work as of January 2020), and Mac OS X.

Metisse is free and open-source software subject to the terms of the GNU General Public License (GPL).

See also 
 Project Looking Glass
 BumpTop
 3D desktop environment

References

External links 
Metisse website
Metisse on GNU/Linux demo YouTube

3D GUIs
Free X window managers